Ceri Large (born 1990) is a female rugby union player.  She made her international debut in 2011 against . She represented  at the 2014 Women's Rugby World Cup. Large played in every pool game because of her impressive performance, but was replaced in the semi-finals by team captain Katy McLean.

References

External links

1990 births
Living people
England women's international rugby union players
English female rugby union players
Rugby union players from Gloucestershire